For garita, see:

bartizan, an overhanging, wall-mounted turret projecting from the walls of mediaeval fortifications 
garitas in Mexico, federal highway checkpoints located in border areas